David Mayer may refer to:
 David Mayer (historian) (born 1928)
David Mayer de Rothschild (born 1978), British adventurer, ecologist, and environmentalist
David R. Mayer (born 1967), American politician

See also
David Mair (disambiguation)
David Meyer (disambiguation)
David May (disambiguation)